Alva may refer to:

People 
 Alva (given name)
 Alva (surname)
 Alva Noto, German musician Carsten Nicolai (born 1965)

Places

Portugal 
 Alva, a civil parish in Castro Daire Municipality
 Alva River, a tributary of the Mondego

United States 
 Alva, Florida, a census-designated place
 Alva Bridge, a bridge over the Caloosahatchee River
 Alva, Kentucky, an unincorporated community
 Blaine, Maine, a town, named Alva before its incorporation
 Alva, Mississippi, an unincorporated community
 Alva, Oklahoma, a city
 Alva, Wyoming, an unincorporated community

Elsewhere 
 Alva, Hansot, a village in Gujarat, India
 Alva, Clackmannanshire, Scotland, a small town
 Alva, Gotland, a settlement in Sweden
 2353 Alva, an asteroid
 Alva, Eldivan, Turkey

Food and drink 
 Alva (grape), an alternative name for the Portuguese wine grape Roupeiro
 Alva, an alternative name for the German wine grape Elbling
 Halva or alva, a sweet made of flour

Other uses 
 Alupa dynasty, Alva is the alternate name of the Alupas, an ancient ruling dynasty from India 
 Alva (automobile), French car manufactured from 1913 to 1923 
 Alva Skates, a skateboard company founded by Tony Alva
 Alva Academy, Clackmannanshire, Scotland, a comprehensive school
 Alva Consolidated Schools, Alva, Florida, on the National Register of Historic Places
 Gunnery Sergeant Alva Bricker, a fictional character on the American sitcom Major Dad

See also 
House of Alba, a Spanish aristocratic family
Alvah, a Biblical name